Tivoli Lake is a body of water in Albany, New York.

References

Geography of Albany, New York
Lakes of New York (state)
Lakes of Albany County, New York